Scotch mist is a common name of the plant species Galium sylvaticum.

Scotch Mist may also refer to:

Arts and entertainment
 Scotch Mist, a former name of the band Pilot
Scotch Mist (play), a 1926 play by Patrick Hastings
"Scotch Mist", a 1960 musical composition by Kenneth Ascher
 "Scotch Mist", an episode of TV series Garth Marenghi's Darkplace
 "Scotch Mist", a track on the CD reissue of the 1971 album Fog on the Tyne by Lindisfarne
Scotch Mist, a webcast by Radiohead promoting their 2007 album In Rainbows

Other uses
Scotch mist (cocktail), a cocktail based on whisky in Scottish cuisine
Scotch mist (phrase), meaning dense mist-like rain
"Scotch mist", a slang expression for "nothing at all" similar to "Fanny Adams"
Cryptanthus 'Scotch Mist', a cultivar of flowering plant Cryptanthus marginatus